The lead ship, name ship, or class leader is the first of a series or class of ships all constructed according to the same general design. The term is applicable to naval ships and large civilian vessels.

Large ships are very complex and may take as many as five to ten years to build.  Improvements based on experience with building and operating the lead ship are likely to be incorporated into the design or construction of later ships in the class, so it is rare to have vessels that are identical.

The second and later ships are often started before the first one is completed, launched and tested. Nevertheless, building copies is still more efficient and cost-effective than building prototypes, and the lead ship will usually be followed by copies with some improvements rather than radically different versions. The improvements will sometimes be retrofitted to the lead ship. Occasionally, the lead ship will be launched and commissioned for shakedown testing before following ships are completed, making the lead ship a combination of template and prototype, rather than expending resources on a prototype that will never see actual use.

Naming

References

External links
 Example of a lead ship announcement from US Navy 
 USS Pennsylvania BB-38 

Ship types